The Volhynia electoral district was a constituency created for the 1917 Russian Constituent Assembly election. The electoral district covered the Volhynian Governorate. The western parts of the governorate were under German or Austrian occupation. U.S. historian Oliver Henry Radkey, whose account forms the basis of the table below, expresses concern that the account from Volhynia (exclusively brought from a 1918 study by N. S. Sviatitski) may have been largely incomplete, possibly an effect of the proximity to the battle lines.

A total of 17 submitted lists were rejected, out of which 5 were peasants' lists.

Results

In Zhitomir town the Polish lost got 3,592 votes (17.4%), the Kadet-Farmer list 3,077 votes (14.9%), the Ukrainian SRs 2,756 votes (13.4%), the Bolsheviks 2,117 votes (10.3%), the Jewish Community Personalities list 1,943 votes (9.5%), the Jewish National Electoral Committee 1,858 votes (9%), the rightist list 1,453 (7%), the Menshevik-Bund list 1,426 votes (6.9%), the SR 1,011 votes (4.9%), the United Jewish Socialist Labour Party 529 votes (2.6%), the Ukrainian Socialist-Federalists 489 votes (2.3%), the Jewish National Party 269 votes (1.3%) and Poalei Zion 104 votes (0.5%). In the Zhitomir garrison the Ukrainian SRs got 1,757 votes (35.8%), the Kadet-Farmer list 931 votes (19.1%), the SR 855 votes (17.4%), the Bolsheviks 656 votes (13.4%), the Polish list 223 votes (4.5%), the Menshevik-Bund list 221 votes (4.5%), the Ukrainian Socialist-Federalist list 113 votes (2.3%), the rightist list 73 votes (1.5%), the Jewish National Electoral Committee 23 votes (0.5%), the United Jewish Socialist Labour Party 23 votes (0.5%), the Jewish Community Personalities list 13 votes (0.2%), the Jewish National Party 12 votes (0.2%) and Poalei Zion 7 votes (0.1%).

References

Electoral districts of the Russian Constituent Assembly election, 1917
1910s elections in Ukraine